Paul Haley II (born January 20, 1988) is an American professional golfer who plays on the Korn Ferry Tour.

Haley played college golf at Georgia Tech. In his senior season, he won the Atlantic Coast Conference Championship. He turned professional after graduating in 2011.

Haley joined the Nationwide Tour (now Korn Ferry Tour) in 2012 where he won his third start of the season at the Chile Classic.

Amateur wins
2006 Texas State Amateur

Professional wins (2)

Korn Ferry Tour wins (2)

Korn Ferry Tour playoff record (0–1)

See also
2012 Web.com Tour graduates
2022 Korn Ferry Tour Finals graduates

External links

Profile on Georgia Tech's official athletic site

American male golfers
Georgia Tech Yellow Jackets men's golfers
PGA Tour golfers
Korn Ferry Tour graduates
Golfers from Dallas
1988 births
Living people